Merthyr Tydfil Football Club was a Welsh football club based at the Penydarren Park ground in Merthyr Tydfil. In 2010 the club was liquidated and reformed under the name Merthyr Town, which was accepted into Division One of the Western League.

History

The club was formed in 1945, and joined the Welsh League. In their first season, they finished as runners-up, and joined the Southern League. The club were immensely successful in their first few seasons, winning the championship in 1947–48, 1949–50, 1950–51, 1951–52 and 1953–54. In the 1947–48 championship-winning season, Merthyr only dropped one point at home (against Colchester United) and only lost four games all season. However, despite their success, the club failed to be elected to the English Football League. The 1950–51 season ended with Merthyr winning the Southern League, the Welsh Cup, the Southern League Cup and the Welsh Challenge Cup.

After bouncing between the various Southern League divisions during the 1960s, 1970s and 1980s, the club finally won their sixth championship in 1988–89, making them joint Southern League title record-holders together with Southampton. This time, winning the championship meant promotion to the Football Conference, the fifth level of English football. The club finished ninth in their first two seasons, and then fourth. However, they then went into decline, and were relegated back to the Southern League in 1995, where they remained until reforming in 2010. They should have been relegated a season earlier, but were reprieved when Northern Premier League champions Marine failed to meet the stadium criteria for the league.

The club's best FA Cup performance was reaching the second round, which they managed in 1946–47 (losing 3–1 to Reading), 1954–55 (losing 7–1 to Bradford City), 1973–74 (losing 3–0 to Hendon), 1979–80 (losing 3–1 in a replay with Chesham United) and 1990–91 (losing 5–1 to Woking). The only time the club managed to defeat a Football League club in the FA Cup was in the first round of the 1946–47 cup, when they beat Bristol Rovers 3–1.

The club were considerably more successful in the Welsh Cup, which they won on three occasions: 1949 (beating Swansea Town 2–0), 1951 (beating Cardiff City 3–2 in a replay) and 1987 (beating Newport County 1–0 in a replay). In addition, the club finished as runners-up in 1947 and 1952.

After winning the final in 1987, the club were allowed to enter the European Cup Winners' Cup, at a time when English clubs were banned from European competition. In the first round, they were drawn against the Italian club Atalanta. The club managed a win in the first leg at home, beating the Italians 2–1. However, the return leg was lost 2–0, and the club was eliminated from the competition.

Historically, the club's biggest rivals are Gloucester City. The two clubs played over 120 times in their history, making it one of the most played Anglo-Welsh derbies in football. In the late 1990s and early 2000s Newport County were local rivals but the teams have not met in the same league for many years.

Honours

League
Southern League/Southern Football League Premier Division
Champions: 1947–48, 1949–50, 1950–51, 1951–52, 1953–54, 1988–89
Runners-up: 1952–53, 1997–98
Southern League Division One
Runners-up: 1970–71
Southern League Division One North
Runners-up: 1978–79
Southern League Division One Midland
Champions: 1987–88
Southern League Western Division
Champions: 2002–03
 Champions 2014–15 Southern Football League Division 1 South & West
Welsh Football League Division One
Runners-up: 1945–46

Cup
Welsh Cup
Winners: 1949, 1951, 1987
Finalists: 1947, 1952
Welsh Football League Cup
Winners: 1951, 1962, 1981
Finalists: 1983

Club records
Record Attendance: 21,000 vs. Reading, FA Cup second round, 1946
Highest league position: 4th in Football Conference, 1991–92
Most goals scored in a league season: 187 in the Welsh League, 1945–46
Fewest goals conceded in a league season: 32 in the Southern League Western Division, 2002–03

References

External links

Club website

Old Merthyr Tydfil: Penydarren Park

 
Welsh football clubs in English leagues
Association football clubs established in 1945
Southern Football League clubs
Defunct football clubs in Wales
Association football clubs disestablished in 2010
1945 establishments in Wales
2010 disestablishments in Wales
Sport in Merthyr Tydfil
Welsh Cup winners
National League (English football) clubs